Fictitious may refer to:
 Fictitious defendants
 Feigned action
 Ejectment, an action to recover land
 John Doe, commonly named as a fictitious defendant

See also
 Fiction, in literary uses
 Legal fiction, in legal uses